Bakerganj-18 is a Former constituency represented in the Jatiya Sangsad (National Parliament) of Bangladesh. It was the seat of the Jatiya Sangsad in Barisal district.

History 
The constituency was created for the first general elections in newly independent Bangladesh, held in 1973.

Members of Parliament

See also 
 1973 Bangladeshi general election
 List of members of the 1st Jatiya Sangsad

References

External links
 

Former parliamentary constituencies of Bangladesh
Barishal District